This is the discography of French singer Elsa Lunghini.

Albums

Studio albums

Live albums

Compilation albums

Box sets

Video albums

Singles

Notes

References

Discographies of French artists
Pop music discographies